Project Appleseed is a marksmanship program that focuses on teaching traditional rifle marksmanship from standing, sitting/kneeling, and prone positions over a two-day weekend shooting clinic called an "Appleseed". It is the primary focus of The Revolutionary War Veterans Association (RWVA), a 501(c)(3) non-profit organization that teaches and promotes traditional rifle marksmanship, while also teaching American heritage and history in order to  encourage civic activism. Project Appleseed is apolitical, a legal requirement of 501(c)(3) organizations, and instructors are barred from discussing modern politics.

The Revolutionary War Veterans Association and Project Appleseed are a Civilian Marksmanship Program affiliated organization, enabling Appleseed participants to buy rifles and ammunition through the CMP.

History
Project Appleseed started from a series of ads appearing in Shotgun News, a monthly gun trade newspaper publication. These ads were written under a pseudonym "Fred." "Fred," the founder of Project Appleseed, whose real name is Jack Dailey, wrote a long running column—actually a portion of ad space for Fred's M14 Stocks—starting in 1999. A common theme in these columns was "Are you a cook or a rifleman?", a "cook" being Fred's term for an unqualified shooter. The name of the project was in deference to Johnny Appleseed, an American pioneer nurseryman and grass roots missionary who traveled the American frontier planting apple trees across the land with the goal of spreading the number of apple trees in America.

Fred's goal was to accomplish the same with civic-minded Riflemen in America. Project Appleseed itself began in April 2006 in Ramseur, North Carolina. These long-running ads ceased in 2017, upon Jack Dailey retiring and selling his business. After Mr. Dailey retired from active leadership in the program in 2015, a board of directors, termed the "Appleseed Oversight Committee" (AOC), assumed responsibility for the program. The current Chairman of the AOC is Tom Kehoe of Palm Bay, FL.  The day-to-day operations of the program are managed by a National Coordinator, currently Rusty Bonkoski of Madison, AL.

In 2006, Appleseed instructors began a national tour to attract instructors who could maintain and develop local programs. As of 2018, more than 120,000 individuals from all 50 states had attended an Appleseed. An independent, sister program called Mapleseed has been developed in Canada. As of 2022, over 900 volunteers serve at Appleseed clinics across the country. These volunteers are both marksmanship instructor and storyteller, sharing history of the opening day of the American Revolutionary War during breaks and over lunch, during two-day Appleseed events.

Although the program initially focused on the use of the M14/M1A and M-1 Garand rifles, students at marksmanship clinics today mostly use semiauto rimfire rifles chambered for the inexpensive .22 Long Rifle cartridge. Targets are placed at 25-meters, and appropriately scaled to simulate distances out to 400 yards. The use of .22 caliber rifles increased the reach of the program by reducing the total cost to attend, and drawing in less-experienced shooters. Students may bring rifles in calibers up to 8mm, if a firing a rifle cartridge, or .45 caliber or less, if shooting a pistol caliber cartridge.

Project Appleseed also offers longer-distance classes such as Rimfire Known Distance clinics (out to 200 yards) and centerfire Known Distance clinics (out to 400 yards) in select locations across the country. In 2019, the program rolled out the Appleseed Pistol Clinic, a which focuses on the fundamentals of pistol marksmanship but stops short of defensive or tactical shooting.
The American history presented at Project Appleseed clinics include the events leading up to the American Revolution, specifically the Battles of Lexington and Concord, and the subsequent British retreat to Boston.  The story is presented in three sections, referred to as the "Three Strikes of the Match."  The Three Strikes are the 3 key events along Battle Road on April 19, 1775, that triggered the Revolutionary War becoming a full-out war.

The volunteers of Project Appleseed also participate in history-only presentations (no shooting involved) called "Libertyseeds."  These events usually feature content on the "Three Strikes" that were needed to start the American Revolutionary War.

The history presented offers special emphasis on the heroism and sacrifices of individuals such as Paul Revere, Dr. Samuel Prescott, and William Dawes; Captains John Parker (Lexington), Isaac Davis (Acton), and Hezekiah Wyman; Elizabeth Zane; and octogenarian Samuel Whittemore, the oldest known colonial combatant in the American Revolutionary War.

Stories of Daniel Morgan and his Morgan's Riflemen are also told. Known Distance Appleseeds often add stories featuring Patrick Ferguson and Timothy Murphy, who were riflemen that played major roles at the Battle of Brandywine, Second Battle of Saratoga, and the Battle of Kings Mountain.

All Appleseed instructors are unpaid volunteers. Prospective instructors go through a rigorous professional development process requiring mastery of the instructional material.  This takes a minimum of 60 hours of hands-on training plus some self-directed study. Instructors in Training wear orange hats while as they progress to the role of full Instructor. Full instructors wear red hats. Marksmanship clinic leaders (known as Shoot Bosses) don green hats when they are serving in that role.

See also
Civilian Marksmanship Program
Designated marksman
High power rifle
Marksmanship Badge (United States)
Shooting sport
Stinson, West Virginia
Wimbledon Cup

Notes and references

External links
 Official site

Marksmanship
Shooting sports